Sıçan Island (also called fare Adası, literally "Mouse Island") is a Mediterranean island in Turkey.

At the past it was one of the Xenagorou islands.

It is situated to the south of East of Topçam Beach. Yılan Island, another island is to the south west of Sıçan Island. The island is ideal for underwater sports even for the beginners.

References

Islands of Antalya Province
Islands of Turkey
Kaş District
Mediterranean islands